Carefree is a town in Maricopa County, Arizona, United States. As of the 2020 United States census, the population of the town was 3,690.

History
Characterized as an upscale residential area, Carefree was conceived in the mid-1950s by business partners K.T. Palmer and Tom Darlington as a master-planned community. Land sales commenced in 1955 and homebuilding started in 1958. Carefree was incorporated in 1984 to avoid annexation by neighboring Scottsdale.

Demographics

As of the census of 2000, there were 2,927 people, 1,389 households, and 995 families residing in the town. The racial makeup of the town was 98% White, <1% Black or African American, <1% Native American, <1% Asian, <1% from other races, and 1% from two or more races. Hispanic or Latino of any race were 3% of the population.

There were 1,389 households, out of which 14.3% had children under the age of 18 living with them, 66.5% were married couples living together, 3.2% had a female householder with no husband present, and 28.3% were non-families. 23.3% of all households were made up of individuals, and 10.7% had someone living alone who was 65 years of age or older.  The average household size was 2.11 and the average family size was 2.44.

In the town, the population was spread out, with 12.7% under the age of 18, 2.0% from 18 to 24, 15.4% from 25 to 44, 40.5% from 45 to 64, and 29.3% who were 65 years of age or older.  The median age was 55 years. For every 100 females, there were 98.6 males.  For every 100 females age 18 and over, there were 97.2 males.

The median income for a household in the town was $88,702, and the median income for a family was $105,699. Males had a median income of $61,050 versus $38,750 for females. The per capita income for the town was $62,433.  About 2.0% of families and 3.2% of the population were below the poverty line, including 1.2% of those under the age of 18 and 3.2% of those 65 and older.

Geography and climate
Carefree is in northeastern Maricopa County, bordered by the city of Scottsdale to the south and east and by the town of Cave Creek to the west. Carefree and Cave Creek are sometimes thought of as a single community.

Carefree has a hot semi-arid climate (Köppen BSh) with hot summers and mild winters, avoiding a designation of arid by being located closer to the rain-catching central mountains of Arizona, so that it receives about 70 percent (around ) more rainfall annually than does Phoenix. There are 141 afternoons annually with highs of at least , 63.4 afternoons of at least , and three afternoons that exceed . Snowfall, although infrequent, can occur. The last measurable snow was February 22, 2019, accumulating 3–6" depending upon the elevation.

Sites of interest

The Carefree sundial, designed by architect Joe Wong and solar engineer John I. Yellott, was erected in the Sundial Circle plaza in 1959 and claims to be the "third largest sundial in the Western Hemisphere". The sundial, which points to the North Star, is made from a steel frame and covered in anodized copper. It measures  in diameter.

Carefree was the long-time home of Southwestern Studios, originally built in 1968 as Fred Graham Studios by actor, stunt man, and Arizona Film Commissioner Fred Graham. The sprawling  desert property adjacent to North Scottsdale featured three state-of-the-art soundstages, edit bays, 35mm screening room, make-up, production facilities, western street and back lot. In the early 1970s, Stage 1 of the studio was used for The New Dick Van Dyke Show starring Dick Van Dyke, Hope Lange, Fannie Flagg, and Marty Brill. Stage 1 also was used for the filming of one of Orson Welles' last films, The Other Side of the Wind, with John Huston, Oja Kodar, Susan Strasberg, Bob Random and Peter Bogdanovich.

The studio was used for the filming of Bob Hope's last feature film, Cancel My Reservation, with Eva Marie Saint, Ralph Bellamy, and Forrest Tucker.  Scenes were also shot in Carefree and at the studio for Michaelangelo Antonioni's Zabriskie Point, on the back lot, where a mock-up of the Carefree mansion was built and then exploded. The studio was also used for Paul Newman's scenes in Pocket Money, for Bill Cosby's feature debut, Man and Boy, for which the western street was built, and for Bill and Ted's Excellent Adventure, again the western street. The short, silent feature Time River was shot on Stages 2 and 3 and extensively on the back lot and western street sets.

Southwestern Studios was also used in television productions. In 1973–74, local resident Hugh Downs produced and hosted two pilot episodes for a unique show, Foursome, that was both a game show and talk show, where four celebrities came together to play various games and interact with each other. In one episode, actors Janet Leigh and Robert Culp and comedians Jo Anne Worley and Alan Sues played a game of tennis. In the other episode, shot on Stage 3, dancer-singer-actor Ann Miller, Robert Culp, Jo Anne Worley, and Alan Sues played a popular board game. In 1974, Southwestern Studios was the location on Stage 2 and the back lot for the filming of the TV movie, McMasters of Sweetwater, starring Jack Cassidy and Loretta Ball and directed by Robert Butler.

Later renamed Carefree Studios, the studio was razed in 1999. The studio, western street, and pristine desert back lot property was developed into retail space and residential development.

Gordon Lightfoot wrote and sang a song named "Carefree Highway". He took the name from a section of Arizona State Route 74 in north Phoenix, to explain his mood at that time. The highway runs from the foot of (North) Tom Darlington Drive at the South-West corner of Carefree about 30 miles westward to Lake Pleasant Parkway in Peoria, AZ.

Education
The town is served by Cave Creek Unified School District.

Transportation
Carefree Highway runs along the south border of Carefree. Cave Creek Road runs along the east edge of Carefree, then curves and becomes an east-west road through Carefree. 

Cave Creek is not a member of Valley Metro and does not have local bus service.

Notable residents
 Eric Bischoff, entrepreneur and professional wrestling producer
 Frederick J. Brown, visual artist
 Howell Conant, fashion photographer, associated with Grace Kelly
 Hugh Downs, broadcaster, television host, news anchor
 Michael Haugen Jr., professional ten-pin bowler and winner of five PBA Tour titles
 Kathleen Hite, scriptwriter for television and radio
 Wilhelm Kuhweide, German Olympic gold medalist, 1964; four-time world sailing champion
 David Lapham, comic book artist
 Dick Stockton, sportscaster
 Dick Van Dyke, actor

References

External links

 

Towns in Maricopa County, Arizona
Populated places established in 1958
1958 establishments in Arizona
Phoenix metropolitan area